Lemyra nigrescens is a moth of the family Erebidae. It was described by Walter Rothschild in 1910. It is found in India (Sikkim, Assam, Darjiling), Bhutan and possibly China (Shanghai, Hunan, Zhejiang).

References

 

nigrescens
Moths described in 1910